Christian Wissel, originally a physicist and professor at the University of Marburg, is an important founding father of modern ecological modelling in Germany. He established an influential department at the Helmholtz Centre for Environmental Research (UFZ) and led it until his retirement in 2005.

External links
Interview with Wissel on ecological modelling 
Department of Ecological Modelling at UFZ

Living people
20th-century German physicists
Academic staff of the University of Marburg
Year of birth missing (living people)